Portezuelo may refer to:
Portezuelo, Chile, a municipality in the province of Itata, Ñuble region.
Portezuelo, Cáceres, a municipality in the province of Cáceres, Extremadura, Spain.
Portezuelo, La Rioja, a municipality in the province of La Rioja, Argentina.